Fabricator may refer to:

Manufacturing
 Manufacturer
 Digital fabricator, a device designed to make (almost) anything
 Surface fabricator, a person or device that transforms one surface into another, or constructs a surface

Other uses
 Fabricator (intelligence), a source agent that provides fraudulent or false information
 Fabricator notice, by an intelligence agency
 Fabricator (album), BWO's third studio album, 2007

See also
 Fabrication (disambiguation)
 Phabricator, software development collaboration tools